Walter Gebhardt (born 10 November 1945) is a retired Austrian football defender who played for Austria. He also played for SK Rapid Wien, Linzer ASK, USK Anif, Wuppertaler SV and SKU Amstetten.

External links

 
 

1945 births
Austrian footballers
Austria international footballers
Association football defenders
SK Rapid Wien players
USK Anif players
Wuppertaler SV players
SKU Amstetten players
LASK players
Living people